These are the election results of the 2004 Malaysian general election by parliamentary constituency. These members of parliament (MPs) representing their constituency from the first sitting of 11th Malaysian Parliament to its dissolution.

The parliamentary election deposit was set at RM 10,000 per candidate. Similar to previous elections, the election deposit will be forfeited if the particular candidate had failed to secure at least 12.5% or one-eighth of the votes.

Perlis

Kedah

Kelantan

Terengganu

Penang

Perak

Pahang

Selangor

Federal Territory of Kuala Lumpur

Putrajaya

Negeri Sembilan

Malacca

Johor

Federal Territory of Labuan

Sabah

Sarawak

References 

General elections in Malaysia
2004 elections in Malaysia
2004 in Malaysia
Election results in Malaysia